2:35 PM is the second studio album American singer-songwriter Calvin Richardson. It was released by Hollywood Records on  September 16, 2003 in the United States.

Critical reception

AllMusic editor Alex Henderson rated the album three stars out of five. He found that 2:35 PM "isn't in a class with Patterson or D'Angelo's best releases; actually, it's mildly uneven and inconsistent. However, the CD's best tracks demonstrate that Richardson is capable of excellence when he puts his mind to it [...] Unfortunately, 2:35 PM also has its share of material that is competent without being terribly memorable, but when Richardson does hit the mark, it is obvious that the R&B world should continue to keep an eye on the North Carolina native."

Track listing

Notes
  denotes co-producer
  denotes additional producer

Personnel 
 
 "Prince" Charles Alexander – engineer
 Ken Benoga – mixing assistance
 Gerry "The Gov" Brown – engineer
 Bob Cavallo – executive producer
 Eddie F – engineer
 Erick Ferrell – assistant engineer
 Brian Gardner – engineer
 "You Can Ask" Giz – engineer
 Kent Hitchcock – engineer
 Jeri Heiden – art direction
 Jake and Trev – engineer
 Anthony Mandler – photography
 Peter Mokran  – engineer
 Glen Nakasako – design
 Kevin Perry – assistant engineer
 Calvin Richardson – executive producer
 David Snow – creative director
 Jesse "Biz" Stewart – recording engineer
 John Tanksley – assistant engineer
 Seth Waldmann – assistant engineer
 Geoffrey Weiss – A&R 
 Willie Young – executive producer, manager

Charts

Release history

References

2003 albums
Calvin Richardson albums